The Creek Fire may refer to:

 Creek Fire (2006), a wildfire that burned in Lassen County, California, in 2006
 Creek Fire (2017), a destructive wildfire that burned in Los Angeles County, California, in December 2017
 Creek Fire (2020), a large, destructive wildfire that burned in Fresno County and Madera County, California, in 2020

See also 
 Beachie Creek Fire, a part of a complex of three fires known as the Santiam Fire in northwest Oregon in September 2020
 Eagle Creek Fire, a destructive wildfire in the Columbia River Gorge — largely in Oregon with smaller spot-fires in Washington — that burned from September, 2017, to May, 2018
 Grizzly Creek Fire, a large wildfire that burned in Glenwood Canyon, Colorado, in 2020
 Pagami Creek Fire, a wildfire in northern Minnesota that began in August, 2011, becoming the largest naturally occurring wildfire in Minnesota in more than a century
 Witch Creek Fire, the second-largest wildfire of the 2007 California wildfire season